Earthpark is a proposed best-in-class educational facility with indoor rain forest and aquarium elements, and a mission of "inspiring generations to learn from the natural world."  It was previously called the Environmental Project.

Earthpark was to be located around Lake Red Rock, near the town of Pella, Iowa.  In December 2007, federal funding from the U.S. Department of Energy for the Pella location was rescinded. Proposals from a variety of potential hosts, some outside of Iowa are being considered.

Location 
Talks between Earthpark and the city of Coralville, Iowa, the original planned location of Earthpark, ended in 2006. The project then found a new home in Pella, Iowa. but that did not become a reality.  A similar project exists in Cornwall, England, called The Eden Project.

Size and scope 
The total project cost for Earthpark is estimated to be US$155 million. The complex was planned to be  in area with a 600,000 gallon aquarium and outdoor wetland and prairie exhibits.

The Earthpark project was expected to employ 150 people directly and create an additional 2000 indirect jobs. The economic impact was estimated to be US$130 million annually. The park was projected to draw 1 million visitors annually to the Pella area.

Funding 
In August 2008, when asked if any efforts would be made to get additional federal money for the project, U.S. Senator Chuck Grassley said "Not by this senator, and I don't think there will be any by other senators."

References

External links 
 
  
  
 
 

Entertainment venues in Iowa
Ecological experiments
Environmental design